Drew Weaver (born May 18, 1987) is an American professional golfer.

Weaver was born in High Point, North Carolina. He grew up playing at nearby Willow Creek Country Club.

He won the 2007 Amateur Championship with a 2 & 1 victory over Australian Tim Stewart.

Weaver played college golf at Virginia Tech. He began competing in professional tournaments shortly after graduating in 2009. He made his first cut in a major at the 2009 U.S. Open where he finished tied for 40th. He played on the 2009 Walker Cup team.

Weaver turned professional in 2009.

Since 2010, Weaver has played mostly on the eGolf Professional Tour and had a successful first year. Off-the-course matters diverted his focus for the first part of the year, as Weaver's mother was battling breast cancer. She regained her health and Drew regained his form. He finished outside of the top 8 only once on Tour after May 2010. He also played two events on the PGA Tour in 2010: the Greenbrier Classic and the Wyndham Championship, where he tied for 41st. In 2011, he played in the Memorial Tournament, finishing T45. It was his third cut in ten career PGA Tour events.

In 2012, Weaver started his eGolf Tour season with two missed cuts. He won two events in the first half of the season and was the tour's money leader. He also became the quickest to earn $100,000 in a season.

In 2015, Weaver qualified for PGA Tour Canada with a T7 at the qualifying tournament. He won the first event of the season, the PC Financial Open.

In 2017, Weaver won the GProTour event at River Hills Country Club April 5–6, by one shot with scores of 68-72 for a total of 140 (−2).

Amateur wins (1)
2007 The Amateur Championship

Professional wins (4)

PGA Tour Canada wins (1)

eGolf Professional Tour wins (3)
2010 Caddy for a Cure Classic
2012 Willow Creek Open, Southern Open

Results in major championships

Note: Weaver never played in the PGA Championship.

CUT = missed the half-way cut
"T" = tied

U.S. national team appearances
Amateur
Walker Cup:  2009 (winners)

References

External links
Profile on U.S. Open's official site

American male golfers
Virginia Tech Hokies men's golfers
Golfers from North Carolina
Sportspeople from High Point, North Carolina
1987 births
Living people